Paul Henry (born 1947) is an English actor, best known for his role as Benny Hawkins in the soap opera Crossroads, on which he appeared on 354 episodes over 11 years. Henry's first acting credit was for his role as Guiccioli on the tv miniseries The Roads to Freedom.

Career
Born in Aston, Birmingham, Henry attended the city's Alderlea Boys School in Shard End with Jeff Lynne. Henry trained at the Birmingham School of Speech and Drama, which was followed by eight years at the Birmingham Repertory Theatre. Between 1975 and 1988, he played his best-known role of Benny Hawkins, a handyman in Crossroads. 

In 1977, Henry recorded "Benny's Theme" with the Mayson Glen Orchestra for Pye Records. It peaked at no. 39 in the UK Singles Chart in January 1978. He was in character as Benny in the song, but spoke rather than sang.

Henry made a guest appearance on the Central Television game show Bullseye, presented by Jim Bowen, on 11 February, 1985. He scored 215 and raised £215 for charity.

His country-boy style gained him the part of Peter Stevens in The Archers for a time. Henry's post-Crossroads career included minor stage roles and the running of a nightclub in Whitchurch, Shropshire, but, in 1994, he returned to television briefly in a tribute to Crossroads, called 30 Years On. In a 2002 interview, Henry said that the public still loved Benny and that during a shopping trip, he returned to his car to find someone had left a piece of paper on it saying, "Benny, we miss you."

Henry appeared in the episode "Stoppo Driver" in The Sweeney playing a gangster.

In 2003, he returned to acting on TV in an episode of the British medical soap opera Doctors. He then played the regular character Frank, a baker's delivery man and later attempted rapist, in the penultimate series of the ITV1 prison drama Bad Girls.

Returning to the stage in 2009, he appeared in a touring version of Run for Your Wife and in the following year portrayed Tony Hancock in the play Hancock's Finest Hour.

The slang phrase "throwing a benny" refers to someone having a temper tantrum and may originate from Henry's Crossroads character.

The comic actor Ronnie Barker revealed in his later years that he had suggested Henry for casting as his cellmate Lennie Godber in the sitcom Porridge, but that Richard Beckinsale was chosen instead. Henry's intended portrayal was the reason the character came from Birmingham.

In October 2017, Henry appeared on Pointless Celebrities alongside Shaun Williamson. They won the jackpot.

Personal life
Henry and his wife Sheila had a son, Anthony, and a daughter, Justine, who died as a result of a traffic collision at the age of 19.

References

External links
 

1947 births
English male soap opera actors
Living people
Male actors from Birmingham, West Midlands